The Coronado Islands (Islas Coronado or Islas Coronados; ; Kumeyaay: Mat hasil ewik kakap) are a group of islands located  off the northwest coast of the Mexican state of Baja California. Battered by the wind and waves, the rocky islands are mostly uninhabited except for a small military detachment and a lighthouse keeper. Despite their barren appearance, they serve as a refuge for seabirds and support a sizable number of plants, including 6 endemic taxa found only on the islands. The waters around the islands support a considerable amount of diverse marine life.

Used extensively and intermittently by the indigenous peoples for thousands of years, the first European explorers sighted them in 1542. Centuries later, they served as weekend getaway locations, secret gambling spots, and smuggling sites until the Mexican Navy clamped down on trespassing. The tied island city of Coronado, California,  to the north, was named in honor of the islands after an 1886 naming competition. During World War II, the islands were utilized in joint training exercises between Mexico and the United States, but gained notoriety when future founder of Scientology, L. Ron Hubbard, shelled the inhabited island, earning the ire of the Mexican government. Today, the islands are a Mexican wildlife refuge; visitors may anchor, scuba, and snorkel, but setting foot on the islands is prohibited without special permission from the government.

Geography
The Coronado Islands are located within the central portion of the Southern California Bight, on the continental margin within Mexico's exclusive economic zone. The islands are exposed continental blocks, produced by the shear zone of the Pacific and North American plates. The islands are under the jurisdiction of Mexico and Tijuana Municipality within the state of Baja California.

It has no bay but boats can anchor on a jetty on the eastern side. It is large enough to support numerous microhabitats for plants, and a has a climate similar to southern Point Loma.
The island has a rocky guano-washed hill on the southern side, and a smaller ridge on the north side, separated by a amphitheater-shaped depression between them. The island is composed of barren, infertile sandstone, with little vegetation. A few succulent plants, such as Opuntia spp. and Dudleya spp. are present on the southern hill, although the soil tends to slough off the slopes. In the basin, straddling both peaks, herbaceous and woody plants occur in the more soil-rich depression.
This island forms a steep-hill with a peninsula-like structure on the northeast side, which creates a protected cove known as Moonlight Cove. This island is extensively weathered and beaten, with unstable material giving way in handful to slope-sized masses. The unstable and barren nature of this island is likely a result of the heavy use by breeding and roosting sea birds combined with unstable substrates. The only abundant plant community occurs on the southwest, windward side of the island.
It has the only bay of the islands, called Puerto Cueva Cove, located one quarter the way down on the east side. On the west side there is a cove known as Seal Cove. There are roughly a half dozen structures above Puerto Cueva, and two navigational lights at the northern and southern ends of the island.

History

Indigenous peoples and Spanish discovery 
The islands have been occupied by humans for over 1,000 years. As the islands lack fresh water, permanent settlements would have not been feasible in the past. However, the islands were frequently visited by the indigenous peoples, such as the Kumeyaay, who likely set up small and temporary encampments. Artifacts have been collected from both islands. North Island has artifacts that include teshoa flakes, and a midden on the saddle of the island. A small cave, Pirate's Cave, was reported to have had remains of ceramics. On South Island, numerous middens exist, including one on the site of the Coronado Islands Yacht Club hotel. The artifacts may be from the La Jolla complex of peoples.  Anthropologist J.P Harrington recorded the Luiseño word for the islands as "mexéelam." The Kumeyaay called the islands mat hasil ewik kakap.

Later archeological expeditions have corroborated reports of ceramic artifacts on the islands, with ceramic fragments found on South Island. These ceramic fragments appear to have been fired in an open oven, and were likely used as cooking pots. Analysis of the artifacts suggests their production techniques are consistent with those of Yuman ceramic manufacture. Radiocarbon dating of abalone shells within the vicinity of the ceramic artifacts suggest that site was occupied intermittently from at least 1390 to 820 calibrated years BP.

In 1542, Spanish explorer Juan Rodríguez Cabrillo was the first European to notice the islands, describing them as Las Islas Desiertas (the desert islands) due to their barren lack of soil. In 1602 the priest for Sebastián Vizcaíno's expedition, Father Antonio de la Ascención, called them  (the four crowned ones) to honor the four brothers who died for their Christian faith. They are also known by a number of other names, with later fisherman, upon seeing floating coffins, ghostly faces and shrouded bodies amid the rocks dubbing them Old Stone Face, The Sarcophagi, Dead Man's Island, and Corpus Christi. They have also been referred to as the Sentinels of San Diego Bay.

Commercial ventures 
Starting in the 1860s, advertisements for day trips to the islands began making appearances in local newspapers. At the same time, commercial fishing ventures also started, focusing mostly on rock cod.

In 1872, the Mexican Navy began visiting the islands to prevent trespassing and reduce the damage from human impact, although business ventures still proceeded regardless. That same year, building stone of high quality was discovered on North Island. Colonel Manuel Ferrer and Tore Fidel Pujal, the editor of the newspaper La Baja California, secured the North Island in 1873, planning to use the stone. The last newspaper report of this venture was in 1882. At one point, the islands were used as a way station in the smuggling of Chinese immigrants into California. This ended after a group of Chinese were found starving and abandoned on the island.

In the 1920s and 1930s, during prohibition, the cove on the northeast side of South Coronado Island was used as a meeting place for alcohol smugglers. Since it was the time before radar, and as foggy nights are common on the islands, the large number of boats frequently resulted in collisions. There was so much traffic that a famous casino, an elaborately constructed two-story building known as the Coronado Islands Yacht Club, flourished well into the Depression. The casino was forced to change trajectory after the Mexican government made gambling illegal only eighteen months after it opened, re-opening the next year as a weekend getaway hotel. It later served as a garrison for Mexican soldiers who had their provisions shipped from the mainland. The structure was ultimately destroyed in the high winds and waves of a storm in 1988. Only the stone foundation remains though the name Smugglers Cove, and more rarely Casino Cove, adorn modern maps.

Around the same time that other boats visited the islands to escape prohibition, during the 1930s, the Star and Crescent Company also made frequent boat excursions to the islands. These were suspended for some time, before briefly starting back again in 1958, with the steamer Silver Gate towing a glass bottom boat to the cove on South Coronado.

World War II and after 

In 1942, Mexico entered the Second World War. Shortly after, the islands were utilized by Mexico and the United States as a site for military exercises. The island was garrisoned by a small detachment of the Mexican Navy, and foxholes were excavated on South Island during this period.

In May 1943 the U.S. Navy's USS PC-815, commanded by L. Ron Hubbard, the future founder of Scientology, conducted unauthorized gunnery exercises involving the shelling of the Coronado Islands, in the belief they were uninhabited and belonged to the United States. Unfortunately for Hubbard, the islands belonged to Mexico and were occupied by the Mexican Navy. The Mexican government complained and Hubbard was relieved of command.

In October of 1944, Lieutenant Robert D. Cullinane, flying a Consolidated PB2Y-3 Coronado, BuNo 7051 of the VPB-13 patrol bombing squadron, perished along with the 12 members of his crew in a crash on South Coronado. Wreckage belonging to the aircraft is located on the western-facing slope of South Island.

The Coronado Islands are under the jurisdiction of the municipality of Tijuana, Baja California, as ruled in the books of the Baja Californian Government, published on December 20, 1959. Today, the only inhabitants of the island are Mexican Navy personnel and a lighthouse keeper on South Island. As the islands are a natural protected area, access to the islands is restricted to governmental personnel and permitted scientists.

Although landing on the islands is prohibited, the waters around them are still a frequent destination for divers, snorkelers and fishermen.

Ecology

Flora

Plant communities 
The topography, soil, and human impact each have effects on the vegetation of the islands, creating varying characteristics on each island. However, the vegetation of the Coronado Islands is mostly dominated by maritime succulent scrub, a plant community within the sage scrub ecosystem of North America, characterized a predominance of succulent plants and a dependence on ocean fog as a consistent source of moisture. It forms a transitional zone between the Mediterranean ecosystems of the California Floristic Province and the subtropical deserts of western North America. It includes a number of species characteristic of the coastal sage scrub, but is complemented by a wide assemblage of endemic species, giving it the greatest species richness of any of the sage scrub communities. Some taxa representative of this environment include succulents such as liveforevers (Dudleya spp.), and cacti like the coastal cholla (Cylindropuntia prolifera), coastal prickly pear (Opuntia littoralis) and the golden-spined cereus (Bergerocactus emoryi).

It occurs farther north, but in a more fragmented pattern, occupying the fringe coastal bluffs and mesas up to the Mexico–United States border and sparsely north to Torrey Pines State Natural Reserve in San Diego County, California. It is also present on the other offshore islands of the region, including Isla San Martin and Todos Santos Island, but also portions of San Clemente and Santa Catalina Island in the southern Channel Islands of California.

On South Island the area at the extreme northern end, near the lighthouse, has diverging vegetation. Here, the vegetation takes on an aspect of coastal sage scrub. Coastal sage scrub consists of low-growing, aromatic and more herbaceous plants with soft, drought-deciduous leaves as opposed to those of the succulent scrub. The dominant plants found in this area include California sagebrush (Artemisia californica), lemonade berry (Rhus integrifolia), California buckwheat (Eriogonum fasciculatum) and toyon (Heteromeles arbutifolia). This area is the only location on South Island where Eriogonum fasciculatum, Heteromeles arbutifolia, and broom baccharis (Baccharis sarothroides) grow. Also present on the north end, but on the east slope, is the endemic Galium coronadoense and Galium angustifolium.Non-native plants such as crystalline ice plant (Mesembryanthemum crystallinum) are present in disturbed areas, especially along trails. Interestingly, this non-native plant provides shelter for the commonly-occurring endemic rattlesnake.

Taxa 
Despite the barren, rocky appearance of the islands, they support a large number of plant species. The following is a comprehensive, but not complete, list of the native plants present on the islands.

Anacardiaceae
 Rhus integrifolia
Apiaceae
 Apiastrum angustifolium
 Daucus pusillus
Asteraceae
 Amblyopappus pusillus
 Artemisia californica
 Baccharis sarothroides
 Chaenactis glabriuscula var. glabriuscula
 Encelia californica
 Eriophyllum confertiflorum
 Hazardia berberidis
 Hazardia orcuttii
 Lasthenia coronaria
 Lasthenia gracilis
 Leptosyne maritima
 Logfia filaginoides
 Malacothrix foliosa
 Malacothrix insularis
 Malacothrix similis
 Perityle emoryi
 Pseudognaphalium biolettii
 Pseudognaphalium microcephalum
 Pseudognaphalium ramosissimum
 Rafinesquia californica
 Stephanomeria diegensis
 Uropappus lindleyi
Boraginaceae
 Cryptantha intermedia
 var. intermedia
 var. johnstonii
 Cryptantha maritima var. maritima
Brassicaceae
 Descurainia pinnata var. brachycarpa var. glabra Lepidium oblongum var. insulare
Cactaceae
 Bergerocactus emoryi
 Cylindropuntia prolifera Mammillaria dioica Opuntia littoralis Opuntia oricolaCaryophyllaceae
 Silene laciniata ssp. laciniata
 Spergularia macrotheca var. macrotheca
Chenopodiaceae
 Aphanisma blitoides Atriplex canescens ssp. canescens
 Atriplex pacifica Atriplex serenana var. davidsonii
 Chenopodium californicum Extriplex californica Suaeda taxifoliaCleomaceae
 Peritoma arborea var. globosa
Convolvulaceae
 Calystegia macrostegia ssp. cyclostegia ssp. intermedia Dichondra occidentalisCrassulaceae
 Crassula connata Dudleya anomala
 Dudleya attenuata ssp. attenuata
 Dudleya candida
 Dudleya lanceolata
 Dudleya × semiteres
Cucurbitaceae
 Marah macrocarpa var. macrocarpa
Euphorbiaceae
 Euphorbia miseraFabaceae
 Acmispon glaber Acmispon maritimus ssp. brevivexillus
 Acmispon watsonii Astragalus trichopodus var. lonchus
 Lupinus succulentus Lupinus truncatus Trifolium willdenovii Vicia hasseiHydrophyllaceae
 Eucrypta chrysanthemifolia var. chrysanthemifolia
 Phacelia distans Phacelia ixodes var. plumosa
 Pholistoma auritum Pholistoma racemosumLiliaceae
 Calochortus splendensMalvaceae
 Malva occidentalisMontiaceae
 Cistanthe maritima Claytonia perfoliata ssp. mexicana
Nyctaginaceae
 Mirabilis laevis var. crassifolia
Orchidaceae
 Piperia cooperiPapaveraceae
 Eschscholzia californica Eschscholzia ramosa Papaver heterophyllumPlantaginaceae
 Antirrhinum nuttallianum ssp. subsessile
 Collinsia heterophylla var. heterophylla
 Nuttallanthus texanusPoaceae
 Achnatherum diegoense Agrostis pallens Bromus arizonicus Bromus carinatus Distichlis spicata Elymus condensatus Elymus triticoides Melica imperfecta Muhlenbergia microsperma Nassella pulchraPolemoniaceae
 Gilia achilleifolia ssp. abrotanifolia
 Linanthus dianthiflorusPolygonaceae
 Eriogonum fasciculatum Pterostegia drymarioidesPolypodiaceae
 Polypodium californicumPteridaceae
 Pellaea andromedifolia var. pubescens
 Pentagramma triangularisRanunculaceae
 Clematis pauciflora Delphinium parryi ssp. maritimum
Resedaceae
 Oligomeris linifoliaRhamnaceae
 Rhamnus insulaRosaceae
 Heteromeles arbutifolia
Rubiaceae
 Galium angustifolium ssp. angustifolium
 Galium aparine Galium coronadoenseSapindaceae
 Aesculus parryiSaxifragaceae
 Jepsonia parryiSolanaceae
 Lycium californicum Nicotiana clevelandii Solanum americanumThemidaceae
 Dichelostemma capitatum ssp. capitatum
Urticaceae
 Parietaria hespera var. californica
Zosteraceae
 Phyllospadix scouleri Fauna 

There are colonies of birds that nest on the islands and can be spotted in the nearby waters like gulls, cormorants, pelicans, storm-petrels, and alcids. The Coronado Islands have the largest known colony of the rare Scripps's murrelet. Pilón de Azúcar, better known as Middle Rock, is host to the northernmost nesting colony of brown boobies on the west coast of North America.

Ten species of reptiles and amphibians are also found on the islands. The best known is the Coronado rattlesnake (Crotalus oreganus caliginis''), which is a smaller subspecies than the one found on the mainland. There is also the Coronado Island gopher snake, which feeds off birds' eggs, the Coronado skink, which is found on all four islands, and the arboreal salamanders which live on the three biggest islands. Southern alligator lizards are found on the north, south and central islands.

There are two types of land mammals on the islands: rabbits and mice. How they reached the islands is currently unknown.

Sea mammals are plentiful and it is not uncommon to see groups of California sea lions and seals. Middle Island is home to a small colony of northern elephant seals.

References

External links
 Islas Coronado Mexico Photo Gallery
 https://web.archive.org/web/20120722175550/http://diver.net/seahunt/maps/coronodos.htm This links to a news article about the use of one of the islands as a waypoint for illegal migration to the United States. November 2010 

Islands of Tijuana Municipality
California chaparral and woodlands
Uninhabited islands of Mexico